Raphaël Jacquelin (born 8 May 1974) is a French professional golfer who plays on the European Tour.

Career
Jacquelin was born in Lyon. He turned professional in 1995, after winning the French Amateur Championship.

Jacquelin began his professional career on the Challenge Tour. In 1997 he claimed two wins on his way to fourth on the season ending money list, which was sufficient to grant him full playing privileges on the European Tour for the following season.

Jacquelin had to wait for his first title at the top level, eventually winning on his 238th European Tour start at the 2005 Open de Madrid. His second victory came in 2007 at the BMW Asian Open. His best finish on the Order of Merit to date has been 20th in 2003.

During part of 2007 and 2008 Jacquelin was the highest ranked French golfer on the Official World Golf Ranking.

Jacquelin won his third Tour title in 2011 at the Sicilian Open with a one stroke victory over England's Anthony Wall. The event had to be concluded on a Monday after bad weather had curtailed Sunday's play. As a result of this win, Jacquelin climbed back into the world's top 100.

In April 2013, Jacquelin claimed his fourth European Tour title in a record equaling sudden-death playoff at the Open de España. After shooting a one-under-par 71 in the final round, Jacquelin was in a three-way tie at the top alongside Felipe Aguilar and Maximilian Kieffer. All three parred the first two playoff holes, before Aguilar was eliminated on the third when he could only make par. Jacquelin and Kieffer played the 18th hole five more times with scores of par made by both. Jacquelin had a putt on the eighth extra hole of six feet to win but could not convert, however at the ninth extra hole he hit his approach to five feet and when Kieffer could only par, Jacquelin converted to clinch victory. The playoff, lasting over two hours, was the joint longest (nine holes) in the history of the European Tour alongside the 1989 KLM Dutch Open.

Amateur wins
1995 French Amateur Championship

Professional wins (8)

European Tour wins (4)

1Co-sanctioned by the Asian Tour

European Tour playoff record (1–1)

Challenge Tour wins (2)

French Tour wins (1)

Other wins (1)
1997 Championnat de France Pro

Results in major championships

CUT = missed the half-way cut
"T" = tied

Summary

Results in World Golf Championships

"T" = Tied

Team appearances
Amateur
European Amateur Team Championship (representing France): 1995

Professional
Alfred Dunhill Cup (representing France): 2000
World Cup (representing France): 2001, 2002, 2003, 2004, 2005, 2006, 2007, 2011
Seve Trophy (representing Continental Europe): 2002, 2003, 2007, 2011

References

External links
 

French male golfers
European Tour golfers
Sportspeople from Lyon
1974 births
Living people